Jefferson County is located in the eastern portion of the state of Missouri. It is a part of the St. Louis Metropolitan Area. As of the 2020 census, the population was 226,739, making it the sixth-most populous county in Missouri. Its county seat is Hillsboro. The county was organized in 1818 and named in honor of former president Thomas Jefferson.

In 1980, according to the U.S. census held that year, the county contained the mean center of U.S. population. Notably, this was the first census in which the center of population was west of the Mississippi River.

Jefferson County is part of the St. Louis Metropolitan Statistical Area and encompasses many of the city's southern suburbs.

Geography
The county's eastern border is the Mississippi River.

Adjacent counties
St. Louis County (north)
Monroe County, Illinois (east)
Ste. Genevieve County (southeast)
St. Francois County (south)
Washington County (southwest)
Franklin County (west)

Major highways
 Interstate 55
 U.S. Route 61
 U.S. Route 67
 Route 21
 Route 30
 Route 109
 Route 110
 Route 141
 Route 231

National protected area
Middle Mississippi River National Wildlife Refuge (part)

Demographics

As of the 2020 Census Jefferson County had a population of 226,739. The ethnic and racial makeup of the county was 90.4% white (89.7% non-Hispanic white), 1.0% black or African American, 0.3% American Indian, 0.8% Asian, 0.8% some other race, and 6.6% two or more races. 2.4% of the population was of Hispanic or Latino origin.

As of the 2010 Census Jefferson County had a population of 218,733. The reported ethnic and racial make up of the population was 95.4% non-Hispanic white, 0.8% African-American, 0.3% Native American, 0.6% Asian, 0.4% reporting some other race, 1.3% reporting two or more races and 1.6% Hispanic or Latino of any race.

As of the census of 2000, there were 198,099 people, 71,499 households, and 54,553 families residing in the county. There were 75,586 housing units at an average density of 115 per square mile (44/km2). The racial makeup of the county was 97.48% White, 0.68% Black or African American, 0.29% Native American, 0.36% Asian, 0.01% Pacific Islander, 0.24% from other races, and 0.93% from two or more races. Approximately 1.01% of the population were Hispanic or Latino of any race.

There were 71,499 households, out of which 38.90% had children under the age of 18 living with them, 61.00% were married couples living together, 10.40% had a female householder with no husband present, and 23.70% were non-families. 18.90% of all households were made up of individuals, and 6.10% had someone living alone who was 65 years of age or older. The average household size was 2.74 and the average family size was 3.12.

In the county, the population was spread out, with 27.90% under the age of 18, 8.50% from 18 to 24, 31.80% from 25 to 44, 22.50% from 45 to 64, and 9.20% who were 65 years of age or older. The median age was 35 years. For every 100 females there were 98.90 males. For every 100 females age 18 and over, there were 95.90 males.

The median income for a household in the county was $60,636, and the median income for a family was $66,697. Males had a median income of $37,822 versus $25,440 for females. The per capita income for the county was $25,058. About 4.90% of families and 6.80% of the population were below the poverty line, including 8.10% of those under age 18 and 6.30% of those age 65 or over.

There were 146,316 registered voters in 2008. As of Oct. 24, 2012, there were 148,011.

2020 Census

Education

Public schools
School District 47 - Crystal City
Crystal City High School - Crystal City
De Soto School District 73 - De Soto
Early Childhood Center (PK)
Athena Elementary School (K-06)
Vineland Elementary School (K-06)
De Soto Jr. High School (07-08)
De Soto High School (09-12)
Dunklin R-V School District - Herculaneum
Festus R-IV School District - Festus
Festus Elementary School (K-03)
Festus Intermediate School (04-06)
Festus Middle School (07-08)
Festus High School (09-12)
Fox C-6 School District - Arnold
Grandview R-II School District - Hillsboro
Grandview Elementary School (K-05) - Hillsboro
Grandview Middle School (06-08) - Hillsboro
Grandview High School (09-12) - Ware
Hillsboro R-3 School District - Hillsboro
Hillsboro Primary School (K-02)
Hillsboro Elementary School (03-04)
Hillsboro Middle School (05-06)
Hillsboro Jr. High School (07-08)
Hillsboro High School (09-12)
Jefferson County R-VII School District - Festus
Plattin Primary School (PK-02) - Plattin
Telegraph Intermediate School (03-05) - Festus
Danby-Rush Tower Middle School (06-08) - Festus
Jefferson High School- Festus
Northwest R-I School District - High Ridge
Brennan Woods Elementary School (K-05) - High Ridge
Cedar Springs Elementary School (K-05) - House Springs
High Ridge Elementary School (K-05) - High Ridge
House Springs Elementary School (K-05) - House Springs
Maple Grove Elementary School (K-05) - Dittmer
Murphy Elementary School (K-05) - High Ridge
Woodridge Middle School (06-08) - High Ridge
Valley Middle School (06-08) - House Springs
Northwest High School (09-12) - Cedar Hill
Sunrise R-IX School District - De Soto
Sunrise Elementary School (K-08) - De Soto
Windsor C-1 School District - Imperial

Private schools
Christian Outreach School (K-12) - Hillsboro - Nondenominational Christian
People's Christian Academy (K-12) - Arnold - Assembly of God/Pentecostal
St. Pius X High School (09-12) - Festus - Roman Catholic
Twin City Christian Academy (PK-12) - Festus - Baptist
Good Shepherd Catholic School - (K-08) - Hillsboro - Roman Catholic
Holy Child Elementary & Middle School - Arnold - (K-08) - Roman Catholic
Manna Christian Academy - De Soto - (K-12) - Southern Baptist
Our Lady's Catholic School - Festus - (K-08) - Roman Catholic
Sacred Heart Catholic School - Festus - (K-08) - Roman Catholic
St. Anthony's Catholic School - High Ridge - (K-08) - Roman Catholic
St. Joseph's Catholic School - Imperial - (K-08) - Roman Catholic
St. Johns Lutheran School - Arnold - (PK-08) - Lutheran
St. Johns School - Imperial - (K-08) - Nondenominational Christianity
St. Rose of Lima Catholic School - De Soto - (K-08) - Roman Catholic

Post-secondary
Jefferson College - Hillsboro A public, two-year community college

Public libraries
 Crystal City Public Library
 De Soto Public Library
Festus Public Library
 Herculaneum Public Library
Jefferson County Public Library

Politics

Local
Historically, the Democratic Party has controlled politics at the local level in Jefferson County but starting in 2010 the Republican Party has flipped the county with 66% of the population voting Republican in 2020.

State

Jefferson County is divided into seven legislative districts in the Missouri House of Representatives; All of which are held by Republicans. Jefferson County consists of two State Senate Districts.

District 111 Shane Roden (R-Cedar Hill). Consists of Byrnes Mill, Cedar Hill, Cedar Hill Lakes, House Springs, and Scottsdale.

District 112 Rob Vescovo (R-Arnold). Consists of areas near Arnold and Byrnes Mill.

District 113 Dan Shaul (R-Imperial). Consists of most Arnold, all of Imperial and Kimmswick, and part of Barnhart.

District 114 Becky Ruth (R-Festus). Consists of part of Barnhart, and all of Crystal City, Festus, Herculaneum, and Pevely.

District 115 Cyndi Buchheit-Courtway (R-Festus). Consists of Olympian Village and areas near De Soto.

District 118 Mike McGirl (R-Potosi). Consists of De Soto and Hillsboro.

Jefferson County is also divided into two districts in the Missouri Senate.

District 3 — Elaine Gannon (R-De Soto) Consists of De Soto, Hillsboro, and Olympian Village as well as part of Festus.

District 22 — Paul Wieland (R-Imperial) Consists of the northern part of the county.

Federal

Jefferson County is divided among three congressional districts. Prior to the 2012 election all of it was included in Missouri's 3rd Congressional District, but now about half of it is in the 3rd District, while the northeastern portion is in the 2nd Congressional District and the southern portion is in the 8th Congressional District.

Political culture

A predominantly suburban county, Jefferson County used to be fairly independent-leaning at the federal level with a tendency to tilt Democratic. Presidential elections in Jefferson County were often very close; George W. Bush just narrowly carried the county in 2004 by less than 600 votes and by just over a half of a percentage point. Al Gore and Barack Obama also just narrowly carried the county in 2000 and 2008, respectively. Bill Clinton, however, did manage to carry Jefferson County by double digits both times in 1992 and 1996.  However, in 2012 the county began to swing hard to the right with Mitt Romney carrying it with 55% of the vote. In 2016 Donald Trump won the county with 65% of the vote, the largest margin of any candidate since Lyndon Johnson in 1964.

Typical of the suburban culture in most counties throughout the country, voters in Jefferson County tend to be rather centrist on social issues but more liberal on economic issues. In 2004, Missourians voted on a constitutional amendment to define marriage as the union between a man and a woman—it overwhelmingly passed Jefferson County with 72.56 percent of the vote. The initiative passed the state with 71 percent of support from voters as Missouri became the first state to ban same-sex marriage. In 2006, Missourians voted on a constitutional amendment to fund and legalize embryonic stem cell research in the state—it narrowly passed Jefferson County with 51.85 percent voting for the measure. The initiative narrowly passed the state with 51 percent of support from voters as Missouri became one of the first states in the nation to approve embryonic stem cell research. In 2006, Missourians voted on a proposition (Proposition B) to increase the minimum wage in the state to $6.50 an hour—it passed Jefferson County with 79.90 percent of the vote. The proposition strongly passed every single county in Missouri with 78.99 percent voting in favor as the minimum wage was increased to $6.50 an hour in the state. During the same election, voters in five other states also strongly approved increases in the minimum wage.

2008 Missouri presidential primary
Republican

U.S. Senator John McCain (R-Arizona) won Jefferson County with 33.54% of the vote. Former Governor Mitt Romney (R-Massachusetts finished in second with 30.45% of the vote, while former Governor Mike Huckabee (R-Arkansas) came in third with 30.19% in Jefferson County. Libertarian-leaning U.S. Representative Ron Paul (R-Texas) finished a distant fourth place with 3.94% of the vote in Jefferson County. McCain received all of Missouri's 58 delegates as the Republican Party utilizes the winner-takes-all system.

Democratic

U.S. Senator Hillary Clinton (D-New York) won Jefferson County over Senator Barack Obama (D-Illinois) with 61.32% of the vote, while Obama received 35.02% of the vote. Although he withdrew from the race, former U.S. Senator John Edwards (D-North Carolina) still received 2.74% of the vote in Jefferson County. Jefferson County gave Clinton one of her strongest showings in a predominantly suburban county in the entire country.

Clinton had a large initial lead in Missouri at the beginning of the evening as the rural precincts began to report, leading several news organizations to call the state for her; however, Obama rallied from behind as the heavily African American precincts from St. Louis began to report and eventually put him over the top. In the end, Obama received 49.32 percent of the vote to Clinton's 47.90% — a 1.42% difference. Both candidates split Missouri's 72 delegates, as the Democratic Party utilizes proportional representation.

Hillary Rodham Clinton received more votes, a total of 19,075, than any candidate from either party in Jefferson County during the 2008 Missouri Presidential Primaries. She also received more votes than the total number of votes cast in the entire Republican Primary in Jefferson County.

Health 
According to a 2012 census study by the University of Wisconsin Population Health Institute and the Robert Wood Johnson Foundation, Jefferson County led the Saint Louis metropolitan area in the number of adults who smoke, roughly 30% of all adult residents of Jefferson County smoked or used tobacco in some form, compared to the 19% national average and the 24% Missouri state average.
Jefferson County and the state of Missouri led the nation in methamphetamine production, peaking in the mid-2000s.

Jefferson County Parks and Recreation

Communities

Cities

 Arnold
 Byrnes Mill
 Crystal City
 De Soto
 Festus
 Herculaneum
 Hillsboro (county seat)
 Kimmswick
 Olympian Village
 Pevely

Villages

 Cedar Hill Lakes
 Lake Tekakwitha
 Parkdale
 Peaceful Village
 Scotsdale

Townships

 Big River
 Central
 High Ridge
 Joachim
 Meramec
 Plattin
 Rock
 Valle

Census-designated places

 Barnhart
 Briarwood Estates
 Cedar Hill
 High Ridge
 Horine
 Imperial
 LaBarque Creek
 Murphy
 Raintree Plantation
 Summer Set

Other unincorporated communities

 Antonia
 Bailey
 Belews Creek
 Bushburg
 Danby
 Dittmer
 Donnell
 Fletcher
 Flucom
 Frumet
 Goldman
 Grubville
 Hematite
 House Springs
 Jarvis
 Knorpp
 Liguori
 Local
 Ludwig
 Mapaville
 Melzo
 Meramec Heights
 Morse Mill
 Munsons
 Oermann
 Old Mines
 Papin
 Plattin
 Regina
 Riverside
 Rush Tower
 Seckman
 Selma
 Sulphur Springs
 Valles Mines
 Victoria
 Vineland
 Ware

See also
 List of counties in Missouri
 National Register of Historic Places listings in Jefferson County, Missouri
 Matthew "Mack" Harrison Marsden

References

External links
 Digitized 1930 Plat Book of Jefferson County  from University of Missouri Division of Special Collections, Archives, and Rare Books
 Jefferson County Heritage and Historical Society of Missouri
 Jefferson County Online
 https://www.sos.mo.gov/CMSImages/Publications/2021-2022_MO_Roster.pdf

 
Missouri counties
1818 establishments in Missouri Territory
Missouri counties on the Mississippi River
Populated places established in 1818
Regions of Greater St. Louis